A Short History of the World is a general history non-fiction book written by Australian historian Geoffrey Blainey.  First published in 2000 by Penguin Books, it describes over 4 million years of history, from before the first people left Africa, through to the current day.

In 2007 Blainey released an abridged (492 pages) paperback version of the book titled A Very Short History of the World.  He also released a double audio CD set of the same name.

Other books of the same title
A book of the same title was written by H. G. Wells in 1920.

British historian John Roberts published A Short History of the World in 1997, as a follow-up to his larger 1994 book History of the World.

Notes

References
 Blainey, Geoffery (2000). A Short History Of The World.  Penguin Books, Victoria.

External links
Review by John Derbyshire, Claremont Review of Books, Spring 2003
Review by R.J.Stove, National Observer, No. 48, Autumn 2001

2000 non-fiction books
Books by Geoffrey Blainey
Penguin Books books